William Francis Zinser (January 6, 1920 – March 16, 2001) was a professional baseball pitcher. He appeared two Major League Baseball games for the Washington Senators in 1944. He was later a scout for the Brooklyn Dodgers.

Zinser had a very short major league career, lasting only two games in 1944. He is most known for scouting future Hall of Famer Sandy Koufax while he pitched for the University of Cincinnati in 1954. His scouting report, which said that Koufax had an incredible arm, was lost in the Dodgers' front office until several other teams had given Koufax a tryout.

External links

1920 births
2001 deaths
Brooklyn Dodgers scouts
Greenville Spinners players
Kinston Eagles players
Major League Baseball pitchers
Sportspeople from Queens, New York
Baseball players from New York City
Washington Senators (1901–1960) players